Brookside is a town in north-central Jefferson County, Alabama, United States.  As of the 2010 census, the population of the town was 1,363. It is a former mining town.

History
The Brookside mine was opened in 1886 by the Coalburg Coal and Coke Company. It was purchased one year later by the Sloss Iron and Steel Company as a source of fuel for their blast furnaces in Birmingham. Following the practice of the time, the mined coal was processed into coke in rows of beehive ovens banked into the hillside below the mine opening. In 1897 a Robinson-Ramsey Coal Washer was installed, increasing the efficiency of coke burning and therefore the overall efficiency of the mine. Other advanced equipment was also installed at Brookside, placing it at the forefront of mining technology in the Birmingham District at the turn of the century.

Brookside served as the headquarters for four Sloss-owned mines in the immediate area (Cardiff, Coalburg, Brazil and Brookside). Because the capacity of Brookside's processing equipment exceeded the mine output, some of the slack from the Brazil mine was brought to Brookside for washing and coking.

Brookside was incorporated in 1898.  The descriptive name Brookside stems from the Five-Mile creek that flows through the town.

Sloss, like other employers in the booming industrial expansion of the early 20th century, had difficulty recruiting skilled labor. Recruitment efforts extended internationally and Brookside became the home of many Czechoslovakian immigrants and their families who made their way to the mines. As Brookside became a destination for Eastern European miners in the area, the culture of the town reflected their ethnic traditions. A Russian Orthodox church was founded and served to strengthen community ties. This church was one of the first Russian Orthodox churches built south of the Mason-Dixon.  Unlike other mines where skilled whites and unskilled blacks could be played against each other by the owners, the Brookside miners were tightly organized and carried out a successful (albeit violent) strike in 1906.

Between 1910 and 1920, mining operations jumped around to several seams and the number of miners fluctuated between a low of 54 in 1910 and a high of over 600 in 1914. In 1913 the mechanical coal cutters used previously were supplanted by hand picks. A new church building for St. Nicholas was completed in 1916.  The 1920 Alabama coal strike, combined with a global depreciation in the coal market, led to a shutdown of the mine. When the strike was settled in 1921, Brookside mine was never re-opened.

In 1924, Brookside served as one of the settings for the Famous Players-Lasky's 1925 feature film Coming Through, which was based on Jack Bethea's novel Bed Rock. Silent film stars Thomas Meighan, Lila Lee and Wallace Beery stayed with local families during production. (Jones-2007)

Sloss removed all of the surface works and held on to the mine property. In 1952 Sloss merged with the U. S. Pipe and Foundry Company, a subsidiary of Jim Walter Industries since 1969.

Saint Nicholas Russian Orthodox Church
Brookside remains a small town with a distinct Eastern European flavor.  Founded in 1894, its onion dome church was re-faced with brick in 1965 and still holds services for approximately 70 congregants.  The “Annual Russian/Slavic Food Festival,” observed the first full weekend of each November, brings visitors to tour the temple, see traditional Eastern European dances, and sample time-honored ethnic plate lunches and baked goods prepared by the Sisterhood of Saint Olga.

Geography
Brookside is located at  (33.631867, -86.913068). It lies along the banks of Five Mile Creek, a tributary of the Locust Fork of the Black Warrior River, in the southern end of the Cumberland Plateau.

Demographics

2020 census

As of the 2020 United States census, there were 1,253 people, 475 households, and 329 families residing in the town.

2010 census
At the 2010 census, there were 1,363 people, 521 households, and 381 families living in the town. The racial makeup of the town was 79.5% White, 18.5% Black or African American, 0.3% Native American, 0.2% from other races, and 1.4% from two or more races. 0.7% of the population were Hispanic or Latino of any race.

Of the 521 households 30.1% had children under the age of 18 living with them, 44.7% were married couples living together, 21.1% had a female householder with no husband present, and 26.9% were non-families. 23.2% of households were one person and 7.7% were one person aged 65 or older. The average household size was 2.62 and the average family size was 3.07.

The age distribution was 25.5% under the age of 18, 8.6% from 18 to 24, 24.5% from 25 to 44, 29.9% from 45 to 64, and 11.4% 65 or older. The median age was 38 years. For every 100 females, there were 88.0 males. For every 100 females age 18 and over, there were 94.3 males.

The median household income was $41,848 and the median family income  was $55,833. Males had a median income of $50,473 versus $31,208 for females. The per capita income for the town was $21,486. About 13.1% of families and 14.5% of the population were below the poverty line, including 13.3% of those under age 18 and 21.1% of those age 65 or over.

2000 census
At the 2000 census, there were 1,393 people, 546 households, and 393 families living in the town. The racial makeup of the town was 90.52% White, 8.69% Black or African American, 0.36% Native American, 0.14% from other races, and 0.29% from two or more races. 0.93% of the population were Hispanic or Latino of any race.

Of the 546 households 31.7% had children under the age of 18 living with them, 51.6% were married couples living together, 15.8% had a female householder with no husband present, and 28.0% were non-families. 26.2% of households were one person and 10.8% were one person aged 65 or older. The average household size was 2.55 and the average family size was 3.08.

The age distribution was 24.8% under the age of 18, 9.4% from 18 to 24, 28.6% from 25 to 44, 24.3% from 45 to 64, and 12.8% 65 or older. The median age was 37 years. For every 100 females, there were 94.0 males. For every 100 females age 18 and over, there were 91.8 males.

The median household income was $29,792 and the median family income  was $34,821. Males had a median income of $30,900 versus $21,563 for females. The per capita income for the town was $14,242. About 14.7% of families and 18.2% of the population were below the poverty line, including 30.6% of those under age 18 and 16.7% of those age 65 or over.

Policing
In 2022, an investigative report by John Archibald of AL.com (the website of The Birmingham News, The Huntsville Times, and the Press-Register of Mobile) uncovered a surge in Brookside Police's aggressive and arbitrary ticketing of motorists passing through the city. Brookside has an unusually high ratio of police officers to residents (nine officers in a 1,253-person town, or one officer for every 144 residents), having grown from just one officer in 2018. In 2020 its officers, who drive unmarked cars and wear uniforms without Brookside insignia, made more arrests for misdemeanors than it has residents. The town went from towing 50 vehicles in 2018 to 789 in 2020. These tickets cost motorists thousands of dollars and have become the city's largest source of revenue. In 2021, more than half of Brookside's revenues stemmed from fines and forfeitures. The town and police department are now defending several lawsuits which have accused Brookside police of fabricating charges and making up laws in order to produce more ticket revenue. One federal lawsuit alleges malicious prosecution of a pastor and his sister, who were charged with impersonating police officers, in retaliation for their having filed a complaint that a Brookside officer allegedly stopped the pastor and used a racist slur against him. The police have written over 400 fines in two years for driving in the left lane despite its not being illegal.

On January 25, 2022, Brookside Police Chief Mike Jones resigned "in the wake of revelations" over the reported policing policy. Elected representatives and officials on both sides of the Alabama Legislature committed to challenging "aggressive policing and churning of often-minor traffic stops" by Brookside Police Department, including Republican Lt. Gov. Will Ainsworth, and Democratic Party chair Chris England. A Newsweek article reiterated the accusations and reported that Brookside mayor Mike Bryan called the town's policing "a positive story," saying of the reports that "Everybody's got a story," and "... 99% of them are lying." Mark Levie Pettway, sheriff for the overarching Jefferson County, stated that "I wouldn’t be surprised if they (FBI) opened up an investigation. You can’t do what’s going on over there."

One person claimed that an officer wore "a Norse sign sometimes appropriated by white supremacists – on a ring and one of his gun clips." The San Francisco Gate website reported that at least seven officers have left the department. The remainder have adopted new uniforms and vehicles to present a less-paramilitary appearance.

The "reports of abuses" by the Brookside Police department caught the attention of the Alabama Senate, which unanimously passed a bill limiting the amount of money cities can keep from fines.

References

Further reading

External links
 (has not been updated for several years)
"What happens when cops start policing for profit" - CNN
Historic American Buildings Survey (HABS) documentation:

Historic American Engineering Record (HAER) documentation:

1886 establishments in Alabama
Birmingham metropolitan area, Alabama
Historic American Buildings Survey in Alabama
Historic American Engineering Record in Alabama
Populated places established in 1886
Towns in Alabama
Towns in Jefferson County, Alabama